Mei Wang (born February 8, 1973, in Wuhan, China) is Professor of Behavioral Finance at the WHU – Otto Beisheim School of Management, one of the leading business schools in Germany. In 2018, she is also adjunct professor at National Chengchi University, Taipei, Taiwan. She is known for her research in behavioral decision making, e.g., the St. Petersburg paradox and Prospect theory, and finance. Together with Thorsten Hens and Marc Oliver Rieger, she was one of the authors of the INTRA survey (International Test on Risk Attitudes) that collected risk and time preferences in 53 countries worldwide leading to various follow-up studies by other researchers and practitioners and media coverage by leading German newspapers.

Mei Wang studied computer science at Xiamen University, obtained a PhD in social and decision science from Carnegie Mellon University, Pittsburgh, United States and later worked as assistant professor at the University of Zurich, Switzerland. She is Associate Editor for Finance Research Letters and member of the editorial board of the Journal of Behavioral and Experimental Finance.

Selected publications

INTRA survey
Marc Oliver Rieger, Mei Wang, & Thorsten Hens (2015) Risk preferences around the world. Management Science, 61(3), 637-648
Mei Wang, Marc O. Rieger, & Thorsten Hens (2016) How time preferences differ: Evidence from 53 countries. Journal of Economic Psychology, 52, 115-135
Marc Oliver Rieger, Mei Wang, & Thorsten Hens (2016) Estimating cumulative prospect theory parameters from an international survey. Theory and Decision, 17, 1-30

Other topics
Marc Oliver Rieger & Mei Wang (2006) Cumulative Prospect Theory and the St. Petersburg Paradox. Economic Theory, 28, 665-679
Christoph Gort, Mei Wang, & Michael Siegrist (2008) Are pension fund managers overconfident? Journal of Behavioral Finance, 9(3), 163-170
Mei Wang, Abraham Bernstein & Marc Chesney (2012) An experimental study on real option strategies. Quantitative Finance, 12(11), 1753-1772

References

University webpage: https://www.whu.edu/en/faculty-research/finance-and-accounting-group/behavioral-finance/team/
Financial Times ranking of WHU: http://rankings.ft.com/businessschoolrankings/whu-otto-beisheim-school-of-management
Finance Research Letters: https://www.journals.elsevier.com/Finance-Research-Letters
Journal of Behavioral and Experimental Finance: https://www.journals.elsevier.com/journal-of-behavioral-and-experimental-finance/
"Die Geduldsprobe" Süddeutschen Zeitung, 2. March, 2016
"Kaum Scharf aufs schnelle Geld: Deutsche sind in Geldfragen am geduldigsten?" Frankfurter Allgemeine (FAZ), 12. January, 2016
"Sparen statt Kredit: Sind die Deutschen das geduldigste Volk?" Wirtschafts Woche, 6. January, 2016
"Die Angst vor Verlusten" Süddeutschen Zeitung, 14. May, 2014
"Three behavioral biases that can affect your investment performance" forbes.com, 21 December 2011.

1973 births
Living people
German economists
Financial economists
Xiamen University alumni